Kidwai Nagar is a neighbourhood located south, in the city of Kanpur, India. It is home to the largest number of Vidhan Sabha members in Uttar Pradesh. Many business persons have their resident here.  Kidwai Nagar is 3 km from the nearest railway station and 2 km from the Jhakarkatti interstate.

Neighbourhoods in Kanpur